La Casa was a small community in southeast Stephens County, Texas, United States.

Today it is considered a ghost town.

References

External links

Ghost towns in Central Texas
Geography of Stephens County, Texas